Sutherland Peak is one of the peaks of the Inland Forts, standing 2 nautical miles (3.7 km) north-northwest of Round Mountain in the Asgard Range of Victoria Land. It was named by the Advisory Committee on Antarctic Names (US-ACAN) for Commander William P. Sutherland, U.S. Navy, Officer-in-Charge of the Naval Support Force winter-over detachment at McMurdo Station in 1974.

Mountains of Victoria Land
McMurdo Dry Valleys